Long Compton is a village and civil parish in Warwickshire, England near the extreme southern tip of Warwickshire, and close to the border with Oxfordshire. It is part of the district of Stratford-on-Avon; in the 2001 census had a population of 705, increasing to 764 at the 2011 Census.

The village is in the Cotswolds. It is served by the A3400 (formerly the A34) from Oxford to Stratford-upon-Avon. As the name implies, it is a long village. In the centre is the large church of St Peter and St Paul, which dates from the 13th century. The parish contains Weston Park, within which was the depopulated settlement of Weston-by-Cherington. 
About one mile south of Long Compton are the Rollright Stones, a neolithic monument.

References

External links

Long Compton Parish Council
Long Compton archives - Our Warwickshire
Photos of Long Compton and surrounding area on geograph

Villages in Warwickshire